Petr Papoušek (born 7 May 1977 in Čáslav) is a Czech former football player. He played as a midfielder and was one of the key players for the Czech Gambrinus liga side FC Slovan Liberec.

References 
 
 
 
 Club Profile 

1977 births
Czech footballers
Czech Republic youth international footballers
Czech Republic under-21 international footballers
Living people
Czech First League players
FC Slovan Liberec players
FK Jablonec players
AC Sparta Prague players
FC Baník Ostrava players
1. FK Příbram players
People from Čáslav
Association football midfielders
Sportspeople from the Central Bohemian Region